The Tornado outbreak sequence of April 1996 was a series of tornado outbreaks that occurred over a three-day period between April 19 to April 21, 1996, across a large area of eastern North America. A total of 118 tornadoes broke out in the Great Lakes, Midwest and Southeast region over the three-day period, killing six people and becoming the most notable outbreak of the year.

The 19th was the most prolific tornado outbreak in Illinois history with 33 tornadoes touching down across the state, breaking the old record of 25 set on August 10, 1974. This outbreak can also be compared to the May 2004 tornado outbreak sequence as it was a very huge, deep and vigorous system. The same system produced tornadoes in Ontario on the 20th; and destructive tornadoes also occurred in Oklahoma, Arkansas and Texas on the 21st.

Meteorological synopsis

April 19
The outbreak occurred when the warm front of a deep storm system moved north and east out of Missouri. April 19 started off cool and skies were overcast ahead of the warm front. Meteorologists were trying to figure out if the warm front would move into Illinois that afternoon. As the day wore on, temperatures warmed, dew points rose, and thunderstorms started to explode in Iowa during the mid-afternoon hours. Although there were some doubts on specifics, the potential significance of the outbreak was rather foreseeable, with storm chasers traveling from the Great Plains and the Storm Prediction Center issuing a high risk early on.

Illinois
A total of 33 tornadoes hit Illinois before spreading west and south into Missouri, and Iowa and east and north into Wisconsin, Michigan, and Indiana on Friday, April 19. The town of Decatur was hit by a large F3 tornado, as were the towns of Urbana and Ogden. Major damage and injuries occurred in all three locations, and one person was killed in Ogden.

Indiana
In Indiana, 21 tornadoes were produced as the cold front moved into the area during the evening hours. Temperatures had warmed well into the 70's and lower 80's (20 to 26 °C) before the storms hit. Five people were injured in Morgan County.

April 20

One of Canada's most prolific tornado events struck Ontario.

A vigorous branch of the jet stream from the Pacific Ocean combined with rich low-level moisture kept the storm system rolling, spinning off more tornadoes in the Southeast. One tornado hit Carroll County, Mississippi, killing teenager Dexter Forman when a tree fell on his mobile home. Another tornado did massive damage to Berea, Kentucky, but no one was killed.

April 21
The outbreak across the south-central U.S. on the 21st was produced by a different weather system.

A final tornado was produced by the first system in southern Quebec, more tornadoes raked through eastern Oklahoma and western Arkansas, killing a father and son and two children in St. Paul and Fort Smith, respectively. Shortly after the outbreak, the local CBS outlet in Fort Smith, Arkansas, KFSM-TV, produced Sunday's Fury, a video production concerning the sequence of events that surrounded the tornado that struck the Fort Smith / Van Buren, Arkansas, area.

Confirmed tornadoes

April 19 event

April 20 event

April 21 event

See also
List of North American tornadoes and tornado outbreaks
Tornado outbreak sequence of April 19–24, 2011

References

External links 

 A wild weekend across the USA (USA Today)
 Overview of the April 19 - 22, 1996 outbreak (USA Today)
 Violent storms lash South, Midwest (CNN)
 Galva, IL Tornado (NWS Quad Cities, IA/IL)
 The Central Illinois Severe Weather Outbreak of April 19, 1996 (University of Illinois at Urbana-Champaign)
 April 19, 1996 - Illinois Tornado Outbreak (University of Illinois at Urbana-Champaign)
 NWS Service Assessment (Ft. Smith and Van Buren, AR)
 Numerical Study of Severe Convection on April 19, 1996 (Proceedings, 19th Conference on Severe Local Storms, American Meteorological Society)
 Initiation and Evolution of Severe Convection in the 19 April 1996 Illinois Tornado Outbreak (Proceedings, 20th Conference on Severe Local Storms, American Meteorological Society)
 The 19 April 1996 Central Illinois Severe/Tornado Event: A WSR-88D Perspective (National Severe Storms Laboratory)
 Federal Disaster Declaration (Federal Emergency Management Agency)
 1900 UTC (2:00 p.m. CDT) Day 1 Outlook Text from April 19, 1996 (incomplete)
 1500 UTC (10:00 a.m. CDT) Day 1 Outlook Text (incomplete)
 PDS Tornado Watch #190

F3 tornadoes
Tornadoes of 1996
Tornadoes in Quebec
Tornadoes in Arkansas
Tornadoes in Illinois
Tornado 1996-04
Tornado 1996-04
Tornado 1996-04
Tornadoes in Ontario
Tornadoes in Oklahoma
Tornadoes in Missouri
Tornadoes in Indiana
Tornadoes in Tennessee
Tornadoes in Kentucky
Tornadoes in Texas
Tornadoes in Mississippi
Tornadoes in North Carolina
Tornadoes in Louisiana
Tornado 1996-04
Tornado
1996-04-21